Karen Hoff (29 May 1921 – 29 February 2000) was a Danish sprint canoeist who competed in the late 1940s and early 1950s. She became the first female Olympic champion in the sport of canoeing when she won the gold medal in the K-1 500 m event at the 1948 Summer Olympics. Karen also won two medals at the ICF Canoe Sprint World Championships with a gold in K-2 500 m in 1948 and a silver in K-1 500 m in 1950.

References

External links

1921 births
2000 deaths
Canoeists at the 1948 Summer Olympics
Danish female canoeists
Olympic canoeists of Denmark
Olympic gold medalists for Denmark
Olympic medalists in canoeing
ICF Canoe Sprint World Championships medalists in kayak
Medalists at the 1948 Summer Olympics